Graham Harvey may refer to:

 Graham Harvey (actor), Australian actor
 Graham Harvey (footballer) (born 1961), Scottish former footballer
 Graham Harvey (religious studies scholar) (born 1959), English scholar
 Graham Harvey (sport shooter) (born 1944), British sports shooter
 Graham Harvey (football manager) (born 1984), English football manager